Flore Gravesteijn (born ) is a Dutch female volleyball player. She is part of the Netherlands women's national volleyball team.

She participated in the 2014 FIVB Volleyball World Grand Prix.
On club level she played for Saint-Cloud Paris SF in 2014.

References

External links
 Profile at FIVB.org

1987 births
Living people
Dutch women's volleyball players
Sportspeople from Gouda, South Holland
Expatriate volleyball players in France
Dutch expatriate sportspeople in France